St Mary's Rosslare are a Gaelic Athletic Association club in County Wexford.  St Mary's were the first winners of the Wexford Senior Football Championship in 1886 under the name of Rosslare Tigers. They include such famous hurlers as 1996 All Ireland winning Wexford manager Liam Griffin and one of Wexfords most experienced players of all time, former Wexford Football Captain & centre back David Murphy.

History
St Mary's Rosslare was founded in 1886. The parish includes from Kilrane, Rosslare Harbour, Tagoat and Rosslare Strand. They won the first ever Wexford Senior Football Championship, beating Crossabeg Ballymurn GAA in the final.

As of 2020, St Mary’s Rosslare have four adult teams, two hurling (Intermediate ‘A’ and Junior B) and two football (Intermediate and Junior B)

The logo was designed by Ray Wickham. He took inspiration from a banner designed by nuns in the local convent for a feile competition. The lighthouse represents Tuskar Lighthouse, Blue for the Sea and Yellow for the Sand. The lightboat represents the James Stephen Lightboat which rescued crew members from a Norwegian schooner (The Mexico) in 1914. For the efforts of Wickham and Duggan they received an All Ireland Hurling Medal. This is the only time outside the field of play that medals have been awarded.

Facilities
The club's main playing field and training centre is the Paddy Roche Centre at Tagoat, just 15 km south of Wexford town and 5 km from Rosslare Europort.

Honours

Wexford Senior Football Championship
Winners: 1886
Wexford Intermediate Football Championship
Winners: 1985, 2005, 2010
Wexford Junior Football Championship
Winners: 1975
Wexford Intermediate Hurling Championship
Runners-Up: 2003
Wexford Junior Hurling Championship
Winners: 1934, 1999, 2019
Wexford Junior B Hurling Championship
Winners: 1984

Notable players

Liam Griffin (hurler)
David Murphy

References

Gaelic games clubs in County Wexford
Hurling clubs in County Wexford